KraftWorks is an advertising agency located in New York City. KraftWorks was founded by Neil Kraft in 2000 after leaving the agency Frierson Mee & Kraft. According to the agency's website, KraftWorks' clients have included Playtex, Aldo, Joseph Abboud, and others.

Notable clients and campaigns 
KraftWorks is well known for their campaigns in the fashion and beauty industry, representing everything from magazines to cosmetics to apparel brands, among others.

Bali Intimates
Playtex
Elizabeth Arden
Coty, Inc.
In 2003, KraftWorks was responsible for Aldo shoes' $5M campaign aimed at international expansion.
Glaceau
Cointreau
Calvin Klein
Voss
Vespa
Joseph Abboud
Jantzen

Additional clients that KraftWorks has partnered with are Ann Taylor, Barneys New York, Boyds Philadelphia, Britney Spears, Celine Dion, CK One, Elizabeth Arden Red Door, Elizabeth Taylor Black Pearls, Joseph Ribkoff, La Prairie, Lacoste, Moët & Chandon, Nina Shoes, Physicians Formula, Popchips, Wonderwall line of clothing from surfer Laird Hamilton, Go Smile, International AntiCounterfeiting Coalition, InStyle, J.Crew, Ralph Lauren, Ritani, Robert Marc, Bitten fashion line launched by Sarah Jessica Parker, Smart Water, Speedo, Vespa, Wonderbra and the Sun Moon Stars fragrance by Karl Lagerfeld.

References

External links 
Agency Website: www.kraftworksnyc.com

Companies based in New York City
Advertising agencies based in New York City